is a single released by High and Mighty Color on October 25, 2006.

Overview
"Enrai: Tooku ni Aru Akari" is the band's eighth single and its last release in 2006. The title track is the third ending theme for the four-part anime feature compilation Mobile Suit Gundam SEED Destiny: Special Edition, and a special ending theme for Mobile Suit Gundam SEED Destiny HD Remaster in 2013. The song also appeared in Drummania/GuitarFreaks V4 as a cover, making the song playable on the arcade machine as well as the compilation album Tokyo Rock City.

The B-side "Kaerimichi no Orenji", was used in a commercial  for the Wii game Bleach Wii: Hakujin Kirameku Rondo. The first pressings of the single came with a special pin-up featuring Gundam SEED Destiny main character  Athrun Zala. The music video for the song was directed by Sueyoshi Nobu.

Track listing
 "Enrai: Tooku ni Aru Akari" (遠雷 ～遠くにある明かり) – 4:23
 "Kaeri Michi no Orenji" (帰り道のオレンジ; Orange Return Trip) – 4:08
 "Enrai: Tooku ni Aru Akari (Less Vocal Track)" – 4:31

All songs written by High and Mighty Color.

Personnel
 Maakii & Yuusuke — vocals
 Kazuto — guitar
 Meg — guitar
 Mackaz — bass
 Sassy — drums

Production
 Through – art direction & design
 Tom Vezo (Minden Pictures/Amana, cover), Hidekazu Maiyama (members) – photographer
 Tsukushi Ichikawa (Mild) – hair & make-up
 Toshio Takeda (Mild) – styling

Charts
Oricon Sales Chart (Japan)

GuitarFreaks & Drummania  

This song is playable as a cover in Drummania/GuitarFreaks V4. It was covered by BeForU member Riyu Kosaka.

References 

2006 singles
High and Mighty Color songs
Anime songs
2006 songs